Dr. Finlay's Casebook is a television drama series that was produced and broadcast by the BBC from 1962 until 1971. Based on A. J. Cronin's 1935 novella Country Doctor, the storylines centred on a general medical practice in the fictional Scottish town of Tannochbrae during the late 1920s. Cronin was the primary writer for the show between 1962 and 1964.

Characters 
The main characters were Dr. Finlay, the junior partner in the practice, played by Bill Simpson, Dr. Cameron, the craggy senior partner, played by Andrew Cruickshank and Janet, their unflappable housekeeper and receptionist at Arden House, played by Barbara Mullen. Other recurrent characters included Dr. Snoddie, Finlay's crusty detractor and Janet's admirer, played by Eric Woodburn and gossipy Mistress Niven (the district nurse whose formal title was mistress midwife), played by Effie Morrison.

Cast 
Bill Simpson as Dr. Alan Finlay
Andrew Cruickshank as Dr. Angus Cameron
Barbara Mullen as Janet MacPherson
Eric Woodburn as Dr. Alexander Snoddie
Effie Morrison as Mistress Niven [Her formal title: mistress midwife]
Neil Wilson as Sgt. Gilbey
David Macmillan as Constable Dickie
Molly Urquhart as Matron
Robert James as Mr. Gibson
Delia Paton as Sister
Bryden Murdoch as Galbraith
Marigold Sharman as Mrs. Rae
James Copeland as 'Hooky' Buchanan
Helena Gloag as Mrs. Ballantyne
Leonard Maguire as	Lewis Gilbride
Calum Mill as Andrew McGregor
John Clegg as Dr Mitchell
Janet Davies as Nurse

Filming location 

Although it is documented that location work for the original series was filmed in the town of Callander in Perthshire, the very first six episodes were filmed in Tannoch Drive, Milngavie, where the fictional Arden House was situated on the right-hand side as one approaches Tannoch Loch.  It was the ducks and swans on that loch that formed part of the opening sequence of the programme. The preceding shot is of the Red Bridge over the River Teith. Other outdoor scenes were filmed in Kilbarchan, Church Street in particular has changed little since filming took place.

In one of those first episodes, Dr. Finlay (Bill Simpson) crashed his old Bullnose Morris into the wall of Arden House—and that was not in the script. Another episode, filmed at night along Mugdock Road, found the local policeman, somewhat inebriated, on his bicycle in a scene with Dr. Snoddie. Episode 1 of series 8 was filmed in Kippen Stirlingshire using the local grocers and butchers shops and also the school. The interior scenes were shot in BBC studios in London and Glasgow.

Uplawmoor railway station was temporarily renamed 'Tannochbrae' in 1966 for an episode of Dr. Finlay's Casebook. BR Class J36 0-6-0 steam locomotive No. 65345 was repainted at Thornton m.p.d. for use in the filming.

Radio 
From 1970 until 1978, episodes from Dr. Finlay's Casebook were broadcast on BBC Radio 4 with some of the same actors from the television programme. 
These episodes were adapted for radio from the original television scripts by the original writers, where possible. Twenty episodes were broadcast on BBC 7 in the autumn of 2003.

In 2001 and 2002, BBC Radio 4 broadcast a version of the original Cronin stories using the titles, The Adventures of a Black Bag and Doctor Finlay – Further Adventures of a Black Bag; these have been rebroadcast by BBC 7. The adaptations are set in Levenford, the original setting chosen by Cronin, rather than Tannochbrae. The role of Dr. Finlay was played by John Gordon Sinclair. Dr. Cameron was played by Brian Pettifer, and Janet was played initially by Katy Murphy, and then by Celia Imrie. David Tennant was a frequent guest actor.

In 1991 BBC Enterprises produced a double cassette copy of four of the radio broadcasts (as of 13 November 2016 a copy of the cover is the profile picture on this listing). 
The Four episodes are: 
Out of the Blue (TV episode Series 6 Broadcast 11 February 1968) (Radio episode 2 June 1970)
The Comical Lad (TV episode Series 5 Broadcast 8 January 1967) (Radio episode 19 February 1973)
The Honours List (TV episode Series 7 Broadcast 16 March 1969) (Radio episode 4 December 1973)
Charlie is My Darling (TV episode Series 2 Broadcast 19 January 1964) (Radio episode 16 January 1975)

The television versions of all these episodes are recorded as missing as of 13 November 2016.

Parody

The series has been parodied in a number of programmes including an episode of Round the Horne set in "Stomachbrae", a play on the fictional TV setting of Tannochbrae. Although the original recording is thought to be lost, an off-air recording has been restored to broadcasting standard.

Music 
The programme's famous theme tune was Trevor Duncan's march from A Little Suite. The other two movements from the Suite were often used as background music. The characters from the series are featured in a song entitled Dr. Finlay by Andy Stewart, which was a minor Top 50 hit in 1965.

DVD and archive status 
Simply Media TV released the first series of Dr Finlay's Casebook in March 2013, and the second series was released in April 2014. Only 10 episodes survive of the second series. The surviving episodes of series 3 and 4 were issued in 2015 and the remaining episodes series 5, 6 & 7 were released in January 2016. The nine surviving episodes from series 8 were released in April 2016. Of a complete run of 191 episodes, 122 are believed to no longer exist.

Controversies
Cronin received copies of the scripts, and he wrote a blunt letter to the series' script editor in 1964, expressing his dissatisfaction with the progression of the show.  Word leaked to the media, and in June 1964, stories appeared in the national press suggesting that the author wanted the series to end. One newspaper even accused the author of "maliciously doing millions out of legitimate enjoyment."  The outcry from the viewing public was immediate, and sackfuls of mail were dispatched to Cronin's home in Switzerland.  He issued a statement on 7 June to refute the charges made against him:   By the following year, the series was a national institution.  A Bill Simpson Fan Club was set up, Andy Stewart's Dr Finlay was in the Hit Parade for five weeks, and Andrew Cruickshank was invited as a guest of honour at the British Medical Association's annual dinner to speak on medical matters as if he were a real GP.

Following the assassination of President Kennedy on 22 November 1963, the BBC screened Dr Finlay's Casebook as part of its regular programming.  There were reportedly over 2,000 phone calls and 500 letters and telegrams complaining about the decision.

See also
Dr. Finlay (about the fictional character)
Doctor Finlay (about the follow-up television series, 1993–96)

References

External links
BBC Scotland – Dr. Finlay's Casebook at bbc.co.uk (clip)
BBC article on 50th anniversary rebroadcast
Dr Finlay's Casebook episodes
British Film Institute Screen Online
 Background to Dr. Finlay's Casebook – television & radio
BBC Radio 4: Dr Finlay
Doctor Finlay: The Further Adventures of a Black Bag – BBC Radio 7

National Library of Scotland
Article about Cronin and the NHS

1960s British drama television series
1970s British drama television series
1962 British television series debuts
1971 British television series endings
1960s Scottish television series
1970s Scottish television series
BBC television dramas
BBC Radio 4 Extra programmes
1960s British medical television series
1970s British medical television series
Lost BBC episodes
Period television series
Radio series about health care
Television shows based on works by A. J. Cronin
Television shows set in Scotland
Television series set in the 1920s
BBC Radio 4 programmes
English-language television shows
Black-and-white British television shows
1962 Scottish television series debuts
1971 Scottish television series endings